Bupyeongsamgeori Station is a subway station on Line 1 of the Incheon Subway located at 770 Bupyeong-dong, 766 Gyeonginno Jiha, Bupyeong-gu, Incheon, South Korea.

Station layout

Exits

References

Metro stations in Incheon
Seoul Metropolitan Subway stations
Railway stations opened in 1999
Bupyeong District
1999 establishments in South Korea
20th-century architecture in South Korea